Kujang may refer to:

Places
 Kujang County, North Pyongan province, North Korea
 Kujang (town)
 Kujang, Odisha, India

Other uses
 Kujang (weapon), a blade weapon native to the Sundanese people of West Java, Indonesia
 , a Clurit-class fast attack craft of the Indonesian Navy

See also
 
 
 Kujang Cikampek (Persero), a subsidiary of Indonesian company PT Pupuk Sriwijaya
 Bogor Raya F.C., an Indonesian football club nicknamed Kujang Warrior